The myrtle warbler (Setophaga coronata) is a small New World warbler. It is considered a subspecies of the yellow-rumped warbler and its own species by different classification societies. The myrtle warbler has a northerly and easterly distribution, with the Audubon's warbler further west. It breeds in much of Canada and the northeastern United States. It is migratory, wintering in the southeastern United States, eastern Central America, and the Caribbean. It is a rare vagrant to western Europe, and has wintered in Great Britain.

The summer male myrtle warbler has a slate blue back, and yellow crown, rump and flank patch. It has white tail patches, and the breast is streaked black. The female has a similar pattern, but the back is brown as are the breast streaks. The myrtle can be distinguished from the similar Audubon's warbler by its whitish eyestripe, white (not yellow) throat, and contrasting cheek patch.  Their trill-like songs, nearly indistinguishable, consist of a 3–4 syllable "tyew-tyew-tyew-tyew", sometimes followed by 3 more "tew"'s. The call is a hard check.

Its breeding habitat is a variety of coniferous and mixed woodland. Myrtle warblers nest in a tree, laying 4–5 eggs in a cup nest.

These birds are insectivorous, but will readily take wax-myrtle berries in winter, a habit which gives the species its name. Experienced birders recognize myrtle warblers with the naked eye by their flycatcher-like habit of making short flights from their perch in search of bugs. They form small flocks on migration or in winter.

Taxonomy
This passerine bird was long known to be closely related to its counterparts Audubon's warbler and myrtle warbler, and at various times the three forms have been classed as either one, two or three species. At present, the American Ornithological Society and Clements considers the myrtle, Audubon's, and Goldman's warbler three subspecies of the yellow-rumped warbler (Setophaga coronata coronata, Setophaga coronata auduboni, and Setophaga coronata goldmani respectively) while the IOC World Bird List classifies the myrtle warbler, Audubon's, and Goldman's warbler as separate species (Setophaga coronata, Setophaga auduboni, and Setophaga goldmani).

Gallery

References

New World Warblers by Curson, Quinn and Beadle, 

myrtle warbler
Birds of Canada
Native birds of the Northeastern United States
myrtle warbler
myrtle warbler